Nikos Kovis (born 6 January 1953), known as Niko Kovi in Turkey, is a Turkish-Greek football player and manager.  He was a central defender. He was born in Istanbul.

Nikos Kovis was the Technical Director of the youth academies of Panathinaikos until 2010.

He was the fourth Greek origin football player who played for Turkish National Football team, after Fenerbahçe S.K. legend Lefter Küçükandonyadis, legendary İstanbulspor captain Koço Kasapoğlu and Beşiktaş J.K. Aleko Yordan.

There is another Greek player born in Turkey and played for Turkish teams.  Alekos Sofianidis was Beşiktaş J.K. left back, but never played for Turkey National Football team.

International career 

He played for Turkey national football team on four different levels.  5 times A National, 3 times B National, 5 times Under-23, and 3 times for A-Youth.

Managerial history 

After he retired Kovis coached Levadiakos F.C., Panargiakos F.C., Proodeftiki F.C., PAS Giannina, EAR, Panarkadikos, Athinaikos and Apollon Smyrnis F.C.

Records and honours 

Kovis won Turkish Cup with Beşiktaş J.K. in 1975, scoring in the second leg against Trabzonspor.

He also won Başbakanlık Kupası (Turkish Presidential Cup) in 1974 scoring the vital goal for Beşiktaş J.K. against Bursaspor.

Kovis won Greek Cup with Panathinaikos in 1982.

Playing career 

He began his career with Vefa SK in 1970.  After 2 years with Vefa SK, Kovis moved to Beşiktaş J.K. in 1972 and played for 6 seasons.  He then transferred to Panathinaikos in 1978 playing for them for 5 seasons.  Kovis also played for OFI for two seasons and retired in 1985.

 1968–69 Vefa SK 1 games no goal
 1969–70 Vefa SK 17 games no goal
 1970–71 Vefa SK 21 games no goal
 1971–72 Vefa SK 29 games 1 goals
 1972–73 Vefa SK 29 games 1 goals
 1973–74 Beşiktaş J.K. 30 games 1 goals
 1974–75 Beşiktaş J.K. 30 games 2 goals
 1975–76 Beşiktaş J.K. 27 games 3 goals
 1976–77 Beşiktaş J.K. 23 games 2 goals
 1977–78 Beşiktaş J.K. 9 games no goal
 1978–79 Panathinaikos 28 games
 1979–80 Panathinaikos 20 goals 1 goal
 1980–81 Panathinaikos 34 games
 1981–82 Panathinaikos 24 games no goal
 1982–83 Panathinaikos 21 games 3 goals
 1983–84 OFI 13 games no goal
 1984–85 OFI 15 games 1 goal

References

External links
 
 
 His picture (http://www.tff.org/default.aspx?pageID=202&ftxtID=874)

1953 births
Living people
Greek footballers
Footballers from Istanbul
Turkey international footballers
Vefa S.K. footballers
Beşiktaş J.K. footballers
Panathinaikos F.C. players
OFI Crete F.C. players
Süper Lig players
Super League Greece players
Greek football managers
Proodeftiki F.C. managers
Apollon Smyrnis F.C. managers
PAS Giannina F.C. managers
Association football central defenders
Constantinopolitan Greeks